Wish Kid is an animated television series that originally aired on Saturday mornings from September 14, 1991, through July 1992 on NBC starring Macaulay Culkin. It was produced by DIC Animation City and Italian company Reteitalia S.p.A., in association with Spanish network Telecinco.

A second series was planned for 1993 to air on The Family Channel, but this was later cancelled.

Synopsis
Nicholas "Nick" McClary (modeled after and voiced by Culkin) owned a baseball glove that had been struck by a miniature shooting star, an event that inexplicably enabled it to magically grant wishes, if punched three times. It was, however, limited to use only once every week, and each wish would expire relatively shortly after it was cast, often at the most inopportune time possible.  Each story — introduced in a live-action prologue by Culkin — revolved around Nick's wishes and the trouble that always seemed to follow. It was up to Nick and others involved to resolve the situation and make things right.

Darryl Singletary was Nick's best friend and the only one in on the secret; he always managed to get tangled up in Nick's adventures. Francis "Frankie" Dutweiler was the neighborhood bully who often antagonized Nick and Darryl. Other characters included Mel and Adrienne McClary, Nick's parents who were a reporter/photographer and real estate agent, respectively; Nick's younger sister, Katie (voiced by Quinn Culkin, Macaulay's real life sister), his pet dog, Slobber, and nosy neighbor, Mrs. Opal.

Voice cast

Episodes

Home media
DIC Video, BMG Kidz and Buena Vista Home Video originally released single episode VHS releases of the series during the 1990s.

In October 2003, Sterling Entertainment released a VHS/DVD titled "Be Careful What You Wish For", containing 3 episodes (4 on the DVD). The DVD was re-released by NCircle Entertainment in February 2008.

In February 2015, Mill Creek Entertainment released Wish Kid - The Complete Series on DVD in Region 1.

Syndication
After the show's initial airing, the show's theme song, which parodied Chantilly Lace, was replaced with a recomposed instrumental version due to copyright issues.

References

External links
 
 Wish Kid at Mill Creek Entertainment

1990s American animated television series
NBC original programming
Television series by DIC Entertainment
Television series by DHX Media
1991 American television series debuts
1991 American television series endings
English-language television shows
American children's animated comedy television series
American children's animated fantasy television series
American television series with live action and animation
Italian children's animated comedy television series
Italian children's animated fantasy television series
Animated television series about children